Chloritis biomphala is a species of land snail, a terrestrial pulmonate gastropod mollusk in the family Camaenidae.

Distribution 
The type locality is Seram Island ("in insula Ceram"), Indonesia. Other locality include Sulawesi, Indonesia.

Shell description 
The shell has moderate size for the genus, brown, without hairs, completely flat, umbilicated, the ends of the peristome connected with a thin callus. The width of the shell is 17–20 mm.

The species is probably described after more than one specimen (a number is not given in the original description, but in the dimensions 10–11 mm is given for the shell height). The species has been never recorded again.

References
This article incorporates CC-BY-3.0 text from the reference.

Further reading 
 Sarasin P. & F. (1899). "Materialien zur Naturgeschichte der Insel Celebes". Band 2: Die Landschnecken von Celebes: I-VIII, 1-248, pls 1-31.― Kreidel’s Verlag, Wiesbaden.

Camaenidae
Gastropods described in 1862